Cherry Hill High School East (also known as Cherry Hill East or CHE) is a four-year comprehensive public high school serving students in ninth through twelfth grades in Cherry Hill, in Camden County, New Jersey, United States, operating as part of the Cherry Hill Public Schools. Cherry Hill East is one of three high schools in the district; the others are Cherry Hill High School West and Cherry Hill Alternative High School.

As of the 2021–22 school year, the school had an enrollment of 2,076 students and 144.0 classroom teachers (on an FTE basis), for a student–teacher ratio of 14.4:1. There were 166 students (8.0% of enrollment) eligible for free lunch and 39 (1.9% of students) eligible for reduced-cost lunch.

History
Due to delays in the construction of the new school building, the entering class of 450 students at Cherry Hill East began the 1966–67 school year attending split sessions at the original Cherry Hill High School building.

Constructed at a cost of $4 million (equivalent to $ million in ), the school building opened in January 1967 as the township's second high school facility. What then became known as Cherry Hill High School West was the first public high school in Cherry Hill. The first class graduated in June 1970, having started their freshman year in the Fall of 1966 in the West building doing split sessions until the East building was ready for occupancy in January 1967. The class of 1970 was the only class in the new building until the class of 1971 arrived in Fall 1967. By Fall 1969, the building housed all four grades.

Social activism

Student demonstrations for school security 
On February 26, 2018, in the wake of the Stoneman Douglas high school shooting and the March for Our Lives Movement, student leaders  staged an auditorium protest against the suspension of a popular history teacher after the teacher claimed that a school shooting was imminent at Cherry Hill East, stating "I have the gun". The next day during class hours, hundreds of East students staged a walkout. They walked through the school's sidewalks and 17 laps around the track field in honor of the 17 victims of the Stoneman Douglas shooting. The total act lasted around an hour before students went back inside. A petition urging the teacher to be reinstated was signed by 500 students. During a school board meeting with Cherry Hill Public Schools Superintendent Joseph Meloche that night, frustrated parents and students voiced their grievances about the school's security and the teacher's suspension.

Student advocacy for mandatory African-American history course 
A group of East students from the Cherry Hill East African American Culture Club (CHEAACC), advocated for a mandatory African American history course in order to graduate. After impassioned speeches by student activists from a variety of backgrounds at a virtual board meeting for Cherry Hill Public Schools in February 2021, the board voted 8–0 to make the course a requirement for graduation- making it the first district in New Jersey to do so. This mandate has been effective since the 2021–2022 school year, making it the first in the state to make it a required course.

Awards, recognition and rankings 
For the 2001–02 school year, Cherry Hill High School East received the National Blue Ribbon Award of Excellence from the United States Department of Education, the highest honor that an American school can achieve.

In 2015, Newsweek ranked Cherry Hill High School East the 85th best high school in the nation out of 22,000 schools.

In its 2013 report on "America's Best High Schools", The Daily Beast ranked the school 354th in the nation among participating public high schools and 29th among schools in New Jersey.

In the 2011 "Ranking America's High Schools" issue by The Washington Post, the school was ranked 65th in New Jersey and 1,833rd nationwide. The school was ranked 1,664th nationwide, the 66th-highest in New Jersey, in Newsweek magazine's 2010 rankings of America's Best High Schools. In Newsweek's 2007 edition of "America's Top Public High Schools" ranked Cherry Hill High School East in 1,258th place, the 38th-highest ranked school in New Jersey.

The school was the 40th-ranked public high school in New Jersey out of 339 schools statewide in New Jersey Monthly magazine's September 2014 cover story on the state's "Top Public High Schools", using a new ranking methodology. The school had been ranked 98th in the state of 328 schools in 2012, after being ranked 57th in 2010 out of 322 schools listed. The magazine ranked the school 61st in 2008 out of 316 schools. The school was ranked 42nd in the magazine's September 2006 issue, which included 316 schools across the state. Schooldigger.com ranked the school tied for 36th out of 381 public high schools statewide in its 2011 rankings (an increase of 16 positions from the 2010 ranking) which were based on the combined percentage of students classified as proficient or above proficient on the mathematics (93.3%) and language arts literacy (98.3%) components of the High School Proficiency Assessment (HSPA).

Cherry Hill High School East won the 1998 National High School Mock Trial Championship, held in Albuquerque, New Mexico.

The American Scholastic Press Association named Cherry Hill High School East's newspaper, Eastside, number one in the country in 2005, 2017 and 2019, and number one in the state from 2007 to 2019.

In 2009, the team representing Cherry Hill High School East produced a documentary that placed nationally in the Senior Group Documentary division of the National History Day competition in College Park, Maryland.

In 2021, a team of 3 students from Cherry Hill High School East was recognized for their app "Apollo" in the Congressional App Challenge.

Grade-fixing scandal
In 2007, the school received coverage for a grade-fixing incident, after two students had been found to have used a teacher's password to hack into the board of education's database and change at least six other students' grades. In September 2006, during a routine check, the school became aware of the changes and began an investigation with the police. In January 2007, two students were arrested for the crime and charged with third degree computer theft. One was a freshman at Drexel University while the other was still a senior at East. The students received probation after pleading guilty. Four more students were disciplined by the school for paying the two hackers to change their grades.

Robotics
The Cherry Hill High School East Robotics club is one of the top programs in the state, consistently sending at least one team to the Vex Robotics World Championship since 2009. The teams have received numerous awards and acknowledgements both within the state and the world. The school has hosted the New Jersey state championship, at which the 2616B team has won the New Jersey state championship for the last three years. The 2616F team (Frightening Lightning) qualified for the World Championship in their rookie year (2013) and won the Teamwork award there. In the 2014 season they won multiple awards and competed at the World Championship again, along with 2616B and 2616D.

Athletics
The Cherry Hill High School East Cougars compete in the Olympic Conference, which is comprised of public and private high schools located in Burlington, Camden and Gloucester counties, and is overseen by the New Jersey State Interscholastic Athletic Association (NJSIAA). With 1,649 students in grades 10–12, the school was classified by the NJSIAA for the 2019–20 school year as Group IV for most athletic competition purposes, which included schools with an enrollment of 1,060 to 5,049 students in that grade range. The football team competes in the National Division of the 95-team West Jersey Football League superconference and was classified by the NJSIAA as Group V South for football for 2018–2020.

Baseball
The varsity boys' baseball team won the 2014 Mingo Bay Classic in Myrtle Beach, South Carolina.  They also won the 1986 and 1998 Olympic Conference Championship. In 2019, the team won the Olympic Conference American Division title and reached the South Jersey, Group 4 sectional final and won the South Jersey Group IV Title in 1998.

Cross country
The varsity boys' cross country team won the South Jersey Group IV boys' NJSIAA sectional championships in 2013 and 2014.  They won their first ever state Group IV boys' NJSIAA championship in 2014.

Basketball
East basketball teams are consistently ranked in the Top Ten in South Jersey. The team won its first ever South Jersey Group IV boys' NJSIAA championship in 2014, defeating Cherokee High School by a score of 54–41. They retained their South Jersey Group IV title in 2015 with a 48–39 win against Cherokee High School in double overtime. The team is coached by David Allen.

Field hockey
In 1971, the field hockey team won the initial South I sectional championship.

Football
The Cougars used to play their home games at the township stadium, Jonas C. Morris Stadium, which they shared with Cherry Hill High School West, however the team now plays its home games at Cherry Hill East. Annually, the Cougars face cross town rival Cherry Hill West on the night before Thanksgiving, a rivalry described by The Philadelphia Inquirer as "one of the best in South Jersey", in which the winner of the contest receives the Al DiBart Memorial Trophy, also known as "The Boot." In the most recent meeting between the two teams, the Cherry Hill West Lions defeated the Cougars 19–7. Cherry Hill West leads the series 36–15. The Cougars have not won "The Boot" in seven years, last beating West in 2012.

The 1988 football team finished the season with a record of 11-0 after winning the South Jersey Group IV state sectional title by defeating Brick Township High School by a score of 36–14 in the championship game.

Volleyball
The girls' volleyball team won its first New Jersey Group IV state championship in 2005, defeating Hunterdon Central Regional High School in the final game of the playoff tournament.

The boys' volleyball team won New Jersey Group IV state championships in 1996 (vs. Fair Lawn High School), 1997 (vs. West New York Memorial High School) and 1998 (vs. East Brunswick High School). The 1996 team ran their record to 22-0 after defeating defending-champion Fair Lawn in three games (16-14, 11-15 and 15–10) in the finals to win the Group III tournament. The 1998 team finished the season at 21-2 after defeating East Brunswick in two games (15–5 and 15–9) in the finals.

Tennis
The girls tennis team won the South state championship in 1973 and 1975. The team won the Group IV state championship in 1982 (vs. Ridgewood High School in the final match of the tournament), 1983, 1989 (vs. Marlboro High School), 1995 (vs. Middletown High School South), 1997 (vs. Hillsborough High School), 2001 (vs. Livingston High School), 2002 (vs. Watchung Hills Regional High School), 2003 (vs. Bridgewater-Raritan High School) and 2004 (vs. Marlboro HS). The team won the 2003 Tournament of Champions, defeating runner-up Montclair Kimberley Academy. The team's 9 group titles are the sixth-most of any school in the state In 2007, the girls' tennis team won the South Jersey, Group IV state sectional championship with a 4–1 win over Washington Township High School in the tournament final. In 2016, the girls' team repeated as South Jersey, Group IV state sectional champion with a 5–0 win over Egg Harbor Township High School.

The boys tennis team won the Group IV state championship in 1979 (defeating Ridgewood High School in the finals), 1980 (vs. Ridgewood), 1983 (vs. Ridgewood), 1990 (vs. East Brunswick High School), 1991 (vs. East Brunswick), 1993 (vs. Livingston High School), 1994 (vs. Bridgewater-Raritan High School) and 1995 (vs. Westfield High School). The program's nine state titles are tied for tenth-most in the state. The team won the 1991 public school state championship against Haddonfield Memorial High School and then the overall state title, defeating Christian Brothers Academy in the public vs. non-public finals. The team won the public school title in 1979 and ran their season record to 22–0 with a 3–2 win against Glen Ridge High School in the finals played at Princeton University's Jadwin Gymnasium. The 1980 team won the Group IV title with a 5–0 win against a Ridgewood squad that came into the finals with a 23-match winning streak. The team won the 2007 South, Group IV state sectional championship with a string of 5–0 wins over Washington Township High School, Toms River High School North, and ultimately Egg Harbor Township High School in the tournament final.

In 2008, the boys tennis team won the South Group IV championship with a win over Lenape. They advanced to the state Group IV tournament where they beat Ridgewood in the semifinal round before losing to defending champion Westfield by a score of 3–2 in the final. In 2019, the team won the South Jersey Group IV title for the first time since 2008, with a win over Lenape. They advanced to the State Group IV tournament where they suffered a 5–0 loss to top-seeded Montgomery in the first round.

Bowling
The boys' bowling team won the overall state championship in 1979. The team won the Group III title in 2007 and went on to win the sport's first Tournament of Champions.

Ice hockey
Cherry Hill High School East has a separate club ice hockey team as a member of the South Jersey High School Ice Hockey League. The team won four consecutive Varsity-Tier II championships in 2017, 2018, 2019 and 2020.

Swimming
The boys swim team won the public school state championship in 1971, 1972 and 1973, won the Division A title in 1974 and 1976–1979, won the Public A title in 2002, 2015, 2017 and 2019; the 14 state titles are tied for sixth most in the state. The girls team won the Division A title in 1975, 1976, 1977, 1979, 1983, 1984, 1986, 1997, 1998 and 1999; the ten state titles are the third-most in the state.

As of 2019, the boys' team has had 11 consecutive Central and South Jersey Group A sectional title wins, eight state Group A championship appearances and three state championship wins.

In 2015, the Cougars won their first state title in 13 years. In 2016, East would again lose to Westfield. In the 2017 championship, a rivalry was reborn between East and Bridgewater-Raritan High School. Their first bout led to East winning its second state title in three years. In the 2018 championship, the Cougars were bested by a strong Bridgewater-Raritan team. The two teams faced off again in the 2019 state championship, where East won the match-up. This was the team's third state title in five years.

Track and field
Cherry Hill East had not had a winning season in almost 30 years until the team of 2009–10 finished their season 3–2. In 2012, the boys' spring track team went undefeated and won the Group IV title, Olympic Conference title, and New Jersey state title. They went to win conference champs again back to back in the 2014 and 2015 outdoor season.

Lacrosse
Cherry Hill East added men's lacrosse to their spring athletics program in 2005. In 2011 they won for the first time the "Lacrosse Head", the trophy given to the team that wins the annual Cherry Hill East vs. Cherry Hill West game.

Clubs, intramural sports, and other extracurriculars
As of the 2022–23 school year, Cherry Hill High School East has more than 100 student led clubs, intramural sports, and other extracurriculars.

For example, Cherry Hill High School East has a Book Club, Chemistry Club, Paranormal Club, Culinary Club, Crochet Club, Fashion Club, Frisbee Club, Interact Club, Hospital Support Club, Photography Club, Reptile Club, and History Club. Cherry Hill High School East also has multiple cultural and linguistic clubs, including American Sign Language Club, African-American Culture Club, the Chinese Student Association, the Jewish Student Union, the French National Honor Society, the Indian Cultural Society, the Latin National Honor Society, Multi-Cultural Day Club, and the Latinos & Amigos Club, among others.

Additionally, the school has a number of team-competition based clubs, such as its Robotics Club, World Affairs Council (which includes Model United Nations), Science Olympiad Team, Debate Team, DECA Club, Cheerleading Team, Badminton Team, and Science Olympiad Team.

Notably, the Cherry Hill High School East Robotics Club offers one of the top high school robotics programs in the world. In the virtual 2020 VEX Robotics World Championship, one of the Robotics Club's teams, dubbed the "Jersey Devils", proved victorious in the playoffs with their robot 2616J. Some media sources classify the Robotics Club as the best Robotics Club in the state of New Jersey.

In November 2022, the History Club hosted United States Deputy Secretary of State Brian P. McKeon for a discussion about the role of the United States Department of State and the country's involvement in global affairs.

Cherry Hill High School East's newspaper, Eastside produces a 24 page monthly publication and has won the New Jersey Distinguished Journalism Award for the past ten years. Eastside's digital counterpart, Eastside Online, was a 2016 National Online Pacemaker Award winner and has won dozens of Best of SNO awards.

Arts
The Cherry Hill East Music Department is award-winning. In 2007, the Cherry Hill East "East Singers" received a Superior Rating and Best Overall Mixed Ensemble from a Boston Choir Competition.

The East Choral program consists of seven performing groups:

Vocal Workshop: Entry-level choir. Consists of grades 9–12.
Chansons: Women's choir comprised of 10th through 12th-grade women. Auditioned group.
Concert Choir: An auditioned mixed choir consisting of 10th through 12th-grade men and women.
East Singers: An Advanced auditioned mixed choir consisting of 10th through 12th-grade men and women. In addition to school concerts, East Singers performs off-campus in select concerts. They made their Carnegie Hall debut in 1997. They performed Carmina Burana at the Kimmel Center in May 2005 as a Concert for Hope to benefit breast cancer research at City of Hope. The concert raised $40,000. In 2006, they hosted the first East Coffee House that raised $8319.00 for Alex's Lemonade Stand.
Belles of East: Auditioned group of young women who sing and accompany themselves on English hand bells.
Vocé (known as Madrigal Singers until 2014): Auditioned group of young men and women who represent the Renaissance era in both music and costume. The group has competed at the Pennsylvania Renaissance Faire where they have won the Highest Accolades Award.
Stay Tuned: An auditioned group of around young men and women (usually composed of members of The Key of She and Casual Harmony) who compete in a cappella competitions around the state and the country with current hits. In 2016, Stay Tuned starred on a Lifetime docuseries, called Pitch Slapped, following their work with Deke Sharon. Stay Tuned regularly competes in the ICHSA (International Championship for High School A Cappella)

No Longer in East's Music Program
Celebrations: An auditioned group of traditional handbell players. Celebrations performed bell arrangements from Classical music to show tunes.
The Key of She: Key of She was an a cappella group in East's music program of 13 young women who, like Casual Harmony, performed popular tunes.
Casual Harmony: An auditioned group of 11 young men who performed everything from ballads to pop tunes. They performed throughout the New Jersey area and have also performed in the Cosmic Rays Cafe in Disney World. Casual Harmony was featured on the NBC morning show, 10!

The Cherry Hill East Instrumental Department is comprised of various performing groups:

Freshman Wind Ensemble: An entry-level instrumental group featuring primarily Freshman students.
Symphonic Band: An entry-level group consisting of students grades 10–12.
Wind Ensemble: An advanced audition group consisting of students grades 10–12.
String Ensemble: An entry-level instrumental group featuring string musicians primarily grades 9 and 10.
Symphonic Orchestra: An advanced full orchestra. This ensemble has been invited to perform at Lincoln Center (2009, 2011, 2012), the Kennedy Center for the Performing Arts (2017, 2020) and Carnegie Hall (2019). In 2013 they won a NJ state-wide festival competition which included both the full Symphony Orchestra and the select string quartet opening in concert for the New Jersey Symphony Orchestra.
Jazz Band: An auditioned group of about 20 students, grades 9–12, who perform classic big band jazz music. This ensemble has won consistent superior and gold ratings, many solo and section awards at festivals around the Delaware Valley. They are past Cavalcade of Bands division winners, and section and solo winners at the Jazz at Lincoln Center Regional Festival at Temple University, Philadelphia.
Jazz Standards Group: An auditioned group of about 5–7 students, who perform straight-ahead, classic small group jazz music.   
 Lab Band: An auditioned group of students, grades 9–12. They experiment with different genres including funk, vocal, and big band charts. The saxophone section won an award for Best Saxophone Section, and the band as a whole got a superior rating at the Deptford High School Jazz Festival in 2019.
Marching band: Cherry Hill East's Marching Band is a non-audition group comprised of students grades 9–12. The band is accompanied by the Cherry Hill East Color Guard. The Marching Band performs their field-show at all of the home football games during half-time and in the stands during the game. They also travel to away football games, playing their field-show before the start of the game and also playing during the game. They have won multiple awards at Marching Band Festival Competitions around the Delaware Valley.
Small Chamber Groups: Cherry Hill East has some small chamber groups which consist of students grades 9–12. These groups include a Saxophones Quartet, a Brass Quintet, a Clarinet ensemble and some other string ensembles.

East's past dramatic shows include Ragtime, Beauty and the Beast, The Music Man, Fiddler on the Roof and, most recently, Legally Blonde. The Cherry Hill East Drama Department perform four shows a year; Lab Theatre, Fall Show, Spring Musical, and the One-Acts Competition.

Administrators
The school's principal is Dr. Dennis Perry. His administration team includes five assistant principals.

Notable alumni

 Brad Ascalon (born 1977), industrial designer known for his contemporary furniture lines produced by companies including "Design Within Reach" and Ligne Roset.
 Lawrence Bender (born 1957), Academy Award-winning producer for film and television whose credits include Reservoir Dogs, Pulp Fiction, Good Will Hunting and An Inconvenient Truth.
 James Berardinelli (born 1967), film critic.
 Matt Bush (born 1986), actor mostly known for his role as the teenager who throws away his minutes in the AT&T commercials.
 Stan Clayton (born 1965), former American football guard and tackle who played in the NFL for the Atlanta Falcons and New England Patriots in 1990 and 1991.
 Andy Coen (born 1964), head football coach of the Lehigh Mountain Hawks football team.
 Angela Duckworth (born 1970), 2013 MacArthur Grant Recipient and professor of psychology at the University of Pennsylvania.
 Bill "Stink" Fisher (born 1970), former National Football League player and actor.
 Ed Foley (born 1967), Temple Owls football tight ends coach, assistant offensive line coach and recruiting coordinator.
 Glenn Foley (born 1970), former NFL quarterback who played for the New York Jets from 1994 to 1998.
 Eric Goldberg (born 1955), animator and film director best known for his work at Walt Disney Animation Studios.
 Adam Goldworm (born 1978, class of 1994), producer of several films and television anthologies including Showtime's Masters of Horror and NBC's Fear Itself.
 Bob Greene (born 1958), personal trainer, frequent guest on The Oprah Winfrey Show.
 Louis Greenwald (born 1967), politician who represents the 6th Legislative District in the New Jersey General Assembly.
 Orel Hershiser (born 1958), former professional baseball pitcher who played most of his career with the Los Angeles Dodgers.
 Tom Hessert III (born 1986), stock car racing driver who competes in the ARCA Menards Series.
 Elie Honig (class of 1993), attorney and CNN senior legal analyst
 Nick Katsikis (born 1967), former professional basketball player.
 Tom Katsikis (born 1967), former professional basketball player.
 Sean Killion (born 1967, class of 1986), former competition swimmer and Pan American Games gold medalist, who represented the United States at the 1992 Summer Olympics.
 Andy Kim (born 1982), Democratic politician who currently represents New Jersey's 3rd congressional district in the United States House of Representatives and formerly served as an adviser to President Obama on national security.
 Pete Kugler (born 1959), defensive lineman who played 10 seasons in the National Football League for the San Francisco 49ers.
 Rick Lancellotti (born 1956), former Major league Baseball player.
 Jamie Leach (born 1969), former professional right wing who played in the NHL for the Pittsburgh Penguins, Hartford Whalers and Florida Panthers.
 Amos Lee (born 1978), singer/songwriter.
 Toby Lightman (born 1978, class of 1996), singer/songwriter.
 Michael Lisicky (born 1964, class of 1982), non-fiction writer and oboist with the Baltimore Symphony Orchestra.
 Jim McGorman (born , class of 1992), musician, songwriter/producer and multi-instrumentalist.
 Cristin Milioti (born 1985, class of 2003), Broadway and film actress, who received a 2012 Tony Award nomination for Best Actress in a Musical for her work in Once.
 Nate Mulberg, assistant coach of the Richmond Spiders baseball team and of the Israel national baseball team.
 Erik Peterson (born 1966), politician who serves in the New Jersey General Assembly representing the 23rd Legislative District.
 Leon Rose (born ), lawyer and sports agent for NBA players, including Allen Iverson and LeBron James.
 J. D. Roth (born 1968, class of 1986), host of Endurance.
 Gary Wang (class of 2011), co-founder and former CTO of cryptocurrency exchange FTX.
 Evan Weiss, musician, of Into It. Over It., Their / They're / There and Pet Symmetry.
 Yang Jin-mo, South Korean film editor, nominated for Academy Award for his work on Parasite

References

External links

Official website
Eastside Online, the school newspaper

Article on removal and reinstatement of 2006 valedictorian Steven Gao and an image of the ad in question
South Jersey Sports: Cherry Hill East HS

1966 establishments in New Jersey
Cherry Hill, New Jersey
Educational institutions established in 1966
Public high schools in Camden County, New Jersey